The 2022 F1600 Championship Series season was the eleventh season of the F1600 Championship Series. The season began on April 1 at Carolina Motorsports Park, and finished on October 17 at Pittsburgh International Race Complex.

Last year's champion, Nicholas d'Orlando of Team Pelfrey, moved up to the USF Juniors on the Road to Indy ladder. Thomas Schrage won the championship with Rice Race Prep. Schrage was chosen for the Team USA Scholarship.

Drivers and teams

Schedule

Results & performance summaries

Driver Standings

See also
2022 F2000 Championship Series

References

F1600 Championship Series seasons
F1600